Bácskai  or Bácskay is a Hungarian habitational surname originally used for a person stemming from the historical region of Bačka, which today is divided between Serbia and Hungary. It may refer to:

Bácskai/Bacskai 
 Béla Bácskai (1912–1994), Hungarian field hockey player
  (born 1946), Hungarian sport parachutist and parachute instructor
 Imre Bacskai (born 1988), Hungarian boxer
  (1908–1996), Hungarian esperantist, editor and lawyer
  (born 1933), Hungarian film director
 János Bácskai (born 1962), Hungarian politician
  (born 1954), Hungarian actor
 Mária Bácskai (born 1938), Hungarian sprinter
 Sára Bácskai (born 1999), Hungarian short track speed skater
 Zsolt Bácskai (born 1975), Hungarian long-distance runner

Bácskay/Bacskay 
  (1861–1938), Hungarian soprano singer
  (1943–2006), Hungarian footballer

Hungarian-language surnames
Toponymic surnames